Panganiban may refer to
Panganiban (surname)
 Panganiban, Catanduanes, a municipality in the Philippines
Jose Panganiban, Camarines Norte, a municipality in the Philippines
Jose Maria Panganiban Monument in Naga, Camarines Sur, Philippines